The Checkers (Japanese: チェッカーズ) was a very popular Japanese band in the 1980s. They were a pop icon of their time as kids copied hair styles and fashion of the band members.  The band was formed in Kurume-city, Fukuoka Pref. by Toru Takeuchi, the leader and the guitarist, who asked Fumiya Fujii to start a band with him in 1980. They won the Yamaha Light Music Contest in Junior category soon after forming the band. Due to some of the members being high school students at the time they were approached with a record deal they waited until those members finished high school. 
They made a debut on 21 September 1983 and split up on 31 December 1992. All of their single releases entered top 10 in Japanese charts, many of them making it to No 1. Fumiya Fujii, who was the lead singer and the main lyricist, went on to pursue a successful solo career.

Although it was a band which produced their own songs, they were frequently regarded as just male aidoru by Japanese rock fans because of their early marketing promotion.

Discography

Singles
Gizagiza Heart no Komoriuta (ギザギザハートの子守唄) (21 September 1983)
Namida no Request (涙のリクエスト) (21 January 1984)
Kanashikute Jealousy (哀しくてジェラシー) (1 May 1984)
Hoshikuzu no Stage (星屑のステージ) (23 August 1984)
Julia ni Heartbreak (ジュリアに傷心) (21 November 1984)
Ano Ko to Scandal (あの娘とスキャンダル) (21 March 1985)
Oretachi no Rockabilly Night (俺たちのロカビリーナイト) (5 July 1985)
Heart of Rainbow: Ai no Niji o Watatte/Blue Pacific (Heart of Rainbow～愛の虹を渡って～/ブルー・パシフィック) (21 September 1985)
Kamisama Help! (神様ヘルプ!) (1 November 1985)
Oh!!Popstar (21 February 1986)
Song for U.S.A. (5 June 1986)
Nana (5 October 1986)
I Love You, Sayonara (5 March 1987)
Wanderer (8 July 1987)
Blue Rain (6 November 1987)
Nanatsu no Umi no Chikyūgi (7つの海の地球儀) (6 November 1987)
One Night Gigolo (21 March 1988)
Jim&Jane no Densetsu (Jim&Janeの伝説) (29 June 1988)
Sunao ni I'm Sorry (素直にI'm Sorry) (21 October 1988)
Room (21 March 1989)
Cherie (5 July 1989)
Friends and Dream (6 December 1989)
Sadame (運命) (21 March 1990)
Yoake no Breath (夜明けのブレス) (21 June 1990)
Sayonara o Mō Ichido (さよならをもう一度) (21 November 1990)
Love '91 (21 March 1991)
Mrs. Mermaid (4 September 1991)
Furetegoran: Please Touch Your Heart (ふれてごらん~Please Touch Your Heart~) (4 December 1991)
Konya no Namida wa Saikō (今夜の涙は最高) (21 March 1992)
Blue Moon Stone (21 May 1992)
Present For You (20 November 1992)

Original albums
Absolutely Checkers/Zettai Checkers/絶対チェッカーズ (21 July 1984)
More! Checkers/Motto Checkers/もっと!チェッカーズ (5 December 1984)
Everyday!! Checkers 毎日!!チェッカーズ (21 August 1985)
Flower (20 March 1986)
Go (2 May 1987)
Screw (21 July 1988)
Seven Heaven (19 July 1989)
Oops! (8 August 1990)
I Have a Dream (21 June 1991)
Blue Moon Stone (19 June 1992)

Best albums
BEST The CHECKERS (21 July 1987)
Checkers The BEST (15 December 1991)
The CHECKERS (6 December 1992)
The OTHER SIDE (16 December 1992)
Early Singles (19 August 1994, Pony Canyon ポニーキャニオン)
Ballade Selection (1 February 1999)
Ballade SelectionII (17 March 1999)
ALL Songs REQUEST (5 March 2003)
COMPLETE The CHECKERS～all singles collection (17 March 2004)
COMPLETE The CHECKERS all singles collection REVERSE (14 July 2004)
All Ballads Request (16 March 2005)

References

See also
 Fumiya Fujii
 List of best-selling music artists in Japan

Japanese rock music groups
Musical groups established in 1981
Musical groups disestablished in 1992
Musical groups from Fukuoka Prefecture